Larkin Poe is an American roots rock band originally from north Georgia, currently based in Nashville, Tennessee, and fronted by sisters Rebecca Lovell (born January 30, 1991) and Megan Lovell (born May 12, 1989). Featuring strong southern harmonies, heavy electric guitar riffs, and slide guitar, they are often touted as "the little sisters of the Allman Brothers". The band performed at the 2014 and 2016 Glastonbury Festival and were voted "Best Discovery of Glastonbury 2014" by the UK's The Observer. The sisters have also toured as backing musicians for a variety of other bands, most notably Elvis Costello, Conor Oberst of Bright Eyes, Kristian Bush of Sugarland, and Keith Urban.

Career
Rebecca and Megan Lovell began their musical careers in 2005 as teenagers with the formation of a bluegrass/Americana group, the Lovell Sisters, with their older sister, Jessica Lovell. After self-releasing two independent albums and touring successfully for four years – appearing on Garrison Keillor's A Prairie Home Companion, the Grand Ole Opry, and performing at Bonnaroo Music Festival – the Lovell Sisters announced the group's disbandment in December 2009. In January 2010, Rebecca and Megan regrouped as Larkin Poe. "Larkin Poe" was the name of the sisters' great-great-great-great-grandfather.

Over the course of 3 years (2010–2013), Larkin Poe self-released 5 independent EPs, 2 collaborative albums, and a live performance DVD. Spring EP (2010), Summer EP (2010), Fall EP (2010), Winter EP (2010), Thick as Thieves EP (2011), The Sound of the Ocean Sound a collaboration with Thom Hell (2013), Killing Time EP a collaboration with Blair Dunlop (2013).

In late 2013, Larkin Poe signed a record deal with RH Music, the music division of San Francisco-based company Restoration Hardware. Following this signing, the band began work on their first full-length album, Kin, which was released in 2014.

In March 2014, producer T Bone Burnett tapped the sisters to record harmonies and instrumentation on The New Basement Tapes' album Lost on the River: The New Basement Tapes alongside Marcus Mumford of Mumford & Sons, Elvis Costello, Jim James of My Morning Jacket, Taylor Goldsmith of Dawes, and Rhiannon Giddens. Rebecca and Megan also appear in the 2014 Showtime documentary Lost Songs: The Basement Tapes Continued.

In June 2014, Larkin Poe performed at the Glastonbury Festival, which resulted in them being named "best discovery of Glastonbury" by The Observer.

In April 2016, Larkin Poe reissued their debut album under the title Reskinned, with a different order of songs and 5 new tracks replacing songs from the original version. They performed their song "Trouble in Mind" on Conan. They also appeared on Steven Tyler's album We're All Somebody from Somewhere, which was released in July of the same year.

In February 2017, Larkin Poe performed as part of the backing band at the MusiCares tribute to Tom Petty in Los Angeles, accompanying such artists as Jackson Browne and Don Henley.

Larkin Poe's cover of the traditional song "John the Revelator" was used as the Series 3 episode 13 ending music for the Fox TV show Lucifer.

In 2017, Larkin Poe released their self-produced sophomore album, Peach, which was nominated for the Blues Foundation Best Emerging Artist Album in 2018.

Larkin Poe released their third studio album, Venom & Faith, on November 9, 2018. The album was recorded in Nashville, produced by Rebecca and Megan, and engineered and mixed by Roger Alan Nichols. Venom & Faith reached #1 on the Billboard blues album chart for the week of November 24, 2018. The album was nominated for the 2020 Grammy Award for Best Contemporary Blues Album.

Larkin Poe were one of the headliners at the 2020 Mahindra Blues Festival in Mumbai, India. Although relatively unknown in that part of the world, the duo left a mark with their performance of "When God Closes a Door". They then surprised their fans with the first live performance of the title track from their next album. Shortly after that, the duo announced the dates of their USA tour via their social media pages.

Larkin Poe's fourth studio album Self Made Man was released on June 12, 2020, on Tricki-Woo Records. The lead single, "She's a Self Made Man", was released in March 2020. Self Made Man reached #1 on the Billboard blues album chart for the week of June 27, 2020, making it their second consecutive number-one album.

On November 20, 2020, Larkin Poe released their fifth studio album, Kindred Spirits, a covers album featuring renditions of songs by Lenny Kravitz, Neil Young, Elvis Presley, Phil Collins, Elton John, and others.

On November 11, 2022, Larkin Poe released their sixth studio album, Blood Harmony.

Band members 

 Rebecca Lovell: lead vocals, electric guitar, acoustic guitar, mandolin, banjo, violin, piano; programs drums, bass and arrangements
 Megan Lovell: harmony vocals, lapsteel, dobro

Discography

Studio albums
 Kin (2014): RH Music
 Reskinned (2016) reissue of Kin: Vertigo, Universal, We Love Music, RH Music, Tricki-Woo Records
 Peach (2017): Tricki-Woo Records
 Venom & Faith (2018): Tricki-Woo Records
 Self Made Man (2020): Tricki-Woo Records
 Kindred Spirits (2020): Tricki-Woo Records
 Blood Harmony (2022): Tricki-Woo Records

Live albums
 Paint the Roses (2021): Tricki-Woo Records

EPs
 Spring (2010): Edvins Records (sold in the US as Larkin Poe via Defpig)
 Summer (2010): Edvins Records
 Fall (2010): Edvins Records
 Winter (2010): Edvins Records
 Thick as Thieves (2011): Edvins Records
 Audiotree Live (digital only) (2017): Audiotree

DVDs
 Thick as Thieves special edition - Live from Stongfjordenn (2012): Edvins Records

Collaborations
 The Sound of the Ocean Sound with Thom Hell (2013): Edvins Records
 Killing Time EP with Blair Dunlop (2013): Rooksmere Records
 Paint the Roses: Live in Concert with Nu Deco Ensemble (2021): Tricki-Woo Records

Box sets
 Band for All Seasons (2010): Edvins Records, Defpig - Contains 4 EPs, Spring, Summer, Fall, and Winter

Other appearances
 The Rainy Day Sessions EP by A Rocket to the Moon (2010)
 Blight and Blossom by Blair Dunlop (2012)
 Shuffle and Deal by Gilmore & Roberts (2012)
 Lost on the River: The New Basement Tapes by The New Basement Tapes (2014)
 Southern Gravity by Kristian Bush (2015)
 Detour: Live at Liverpool Philharmonic Hall by Elvis Costello (2015)
 We're All Somebody from Somewhere by Steven Tyler (2016)
 The Weight by Playing for Change (2019)
 Hardware by Billy Gibbons (2021)
 I Shall Be Released from Dirt Does Dylan by Nitty Gritty Dirt Band (2022)

References

External links

2010 establishments in Georgia (U.S. state)
American blues rock musical groups
American folk rock groups
Female-fronted musical groups
Musical groups from Georgia (U.S. state)
Roots rock music groups
Sibling musical duos